Route 865 is a  long mostly north–south secondary highway in the south-western portion of New Brunswick, Canada.

Route description
Most of the route is in Kings County.

The route's northeastern terminus is in Norton at the intersection of Route 124 and Route 1, where it travels southeast through a mostly wooded area to Southfield Road. From here, the route follows a river past Southfield, Cassidy Lake, and Camp Tulakadik to the eastern terminus of Route 860 in Clover Hill. The route ends in the community of Hillsdale at Route 111.

History

See also

References

865
865